Neutrophil cytosol factor 2 is a protein that in humans is encoded by the NCF2 gene.

Function 

This gene encodes neutrophil cytosolic factor 2, the 67-kilodalton cytosolic subunit of the multi-protein complex known as NADPH oxidase found in neutrophils. This oxidase produces a burst of superoxide which is delivered to the lumen of the neutrophil phagosome. Mutations in this gene, as well as in other NADPH oxidase subunits, can result in chronic granulomatous disease.

References

Further reading

External links